N.A.B. was a football (soccer) club in Adelaide, South Australia. The club was established in 1989 and was based at Athelstone Recreation Reserve in the Adelaide suburb of Athelstone, South Australia. Eastern United FC was established upon the collapse of the N.A.B. SC.

References

Soccer clubs in Adelaide
Soccer clubs in South Australia
Association football clubs established in 1981
1981 establishments in Australia